The Dying Sun is a science fiction novel by Gary Blackwood, published in 1989.  Set in the mid-21st century, the book depicts a world where the sun's light is actually diminishing over time, cooling the Earth (as opposed to global warming), which causes a mass migration from the U.S. to Mexico. The large influx from the north causes overpopulation and a wave of violence in the south, and James and Robert, two friends, decide to go north to escape the crime-ridden south.

The novel is a 1990 Friends of American Writers Best Young Adult Novel.

References

1989 American novels
1989 science fiction novels
Children's science fiction novels
American young adult novels
Novels by Gary Blackwood
Novels set in Mexico
Fiction set in the 2050s
Novels set in the 21st century
Novels set in the future